Palar (Hindi: पालर), is a village in Uttarkashi district of Uttarakhand state in India. Situated on the banks of Yamuna river and the terminating railway station on the Uttarkashi-Palar Yamunotri Railway route of Chota Char Dham Railway nearest to Yamunotri.

Geography
It is located close to Yamunotri.

Near the RAAJGARHI.
PALAR is a village in district Uttarkashi of UTTARAKHAND situated on the bank of the river Yamuna and Kedar Ganga, which originated from the mountain Kedar Kantha.
The village is the central point of beauty of the area. The village is known for its Prosperity. The village is also selected for the terminating station for the railway line between Uttarkashi to Yamunotri.

Demographics
 India census, village has 135 families with a total population of 648.

Adventure sports
 White water rafting
 Trekking tracks
 Mountaineering

See also
1991 Uttarkashi earthquake

References

External links
Uttarkashi district, Official website
Uttarkashi district Tourism 
Resort in Uttarkashi

Cities and towns in Uttarkashi district